Kouthaung ( kui:saung:bhu.ra:  Koùthaùñ hpăyà) is the largest Buddhist temple in Mrauk U, Myanmar. The name means "Temple of 90,000 Buddha Images". The temple was built between 1554 and 1556 by King Dikkha.

Photo gallery

See also
 Shite-thaung Temple
 Htukkanthein Temple
 Andaw-thein Ordination Hall
 Le-myet-hna Temple
 Ratanabon Pagoda 
 List of Buddhist temples in Myanmar

References

Bibliography
 

Buddhist temples in Rakhine State
16th-century Buddhist temples
1556 establishments in Asia
Religious buildings and structures completed in 1556